The filmography of the Sri Lankan Tamil cinema is as follows.

Early films 1960s

Films released in 1970s

Films released in 1980s

Latest films

Films yet to be released

See also
 Sri Lankan Tamils in Sinhala Cinema
 Sri Lankan Tamil Cinema

References

External links
 Sri LankanTamilFilm.com